Microscopy and Microanalysis is a peer-reviewed scientific journal that covers original research in the fields of microscopy, imaging, and compositional analysis, including electron microscopy, fluorescence microscopy, atomic force microscopy, and live-cell imaging.

It was established in February 1995, and is published by Cambridge University Press,  All articles published first appear online in The Cambridge Core section known as FirstView. According to the Journal Citation Reports, its 2019 impact factor is 3.414.

References

External links 
 

English-language journals
Cambridge University Press academic journals
Biology journals
Publications established in 1995
Bimonthly journals